The 2007 Spar European Cup took place on 23 and 24 June 2007 at the Olympic Stadium in Munich, Germany. This was the 27th time the European Cup has been held and the second time the event has been hosted in Munich. It was the penultimate staging of the Cup.

Super League

Final standings

Top six teams qualified for the 2008 European Indoor Cup.

Score table

Day 1

Events and winners

Standings

Day 2

Events and winners

Men's results

Women's results

First League

Group A
At Vaasa, Finland, on 23 and 24 June 2007.

Final standings

Group B
At Milan, Italy, on the same dates.

Final standings

The best team from each group also qualified for the 2008 European Indoor Cup.

Second League

Group A
At Odense, Denmark, on 23 & 24 June 2007.

Final standings

Group B
At Zenica, Bosnia and Herzegovina, on the same dates.

Final standings

See also
2007 in athletics (track and field)

External links
European Cup 2007 – Germany from 23 to 24 June 2007 (all results)

2007
European Cup
Sports competitions in Munich
European Cup,2007
European Cup,2007
European Cup,2007
European Cup,2007
European Cup,2007
Sports competitions in Milan
2007,European Cup (athletics)
June 2007 sports events in Europe
Sport in Vaasa
Sport in Zenica
Sport in Odense
2007,European Cup (athletics)
2007 in Danish sport
2007 in Italian sport
2007 in Bosnia and Herzegovina sport
2007 in Finnish sport